Mazzaroth (Hebrew Transliteration: מַזָּרוֹת Mazzārōṯ, LXX Μαζουρωθ, Mazourōth) is a Biblical Hebrew Word found in the Book of Job (38:32) and literally meaning "constellations," according to 10th-century biblical exegete Saadia Gaon, while others interpret the word as Garland of Crowns, but its context is that of Astronomical Constellations, and it is often interpreted as a term for the Zodiac or the Constellations thereof..
The similar word mazalot (מַּזָּלוֹת)  in  may be related. 

The word itself is a hapax legomenon (i.e., a word appearing only once in a text) of the Hebrew Bible. In Yiddish, the term   mazalot came to be used in the sense of "astrology" in general, surviving in the expression "mazel tov," meaning "good fortune."

Biblical context
The appearance of the word in the Book of Job appears in the context of various astronomical phenomena:

"Canst thou bind the chains of the Pleiades, or loose the bands of Orion? Canst thou lead forth the Mazzaroth in their season? Or canst thou guide the Bear with her sons?" (JPS 1917)

The related word mazalot (מַּזָּלוֹת) in 2 Kings may have a different meaning, and is often translated differently, with the linkage of this word to the planets or the zodiac being more widely held (in Kabbalistic astrology, mazalot was also used for astrology in general, and the word may be related to the Assyrian manzaltu, "station"):

And the king stood on the platform, and made a covenant before the LORD, to walk after the LORD, and to keep His commandments, and His testimonies, and His statutes, with all his heart, and all his soul, to confirm the words of this covenant that were written in this book; and all the people stood to the covenant.  And the king commanded Hilkiah the high priest, and the priests of the second order, and the keepers of the door, to bring forth out of the temple of the LORD all the vessels that were made for Baal, and for the Asherah, and for all the host of heaven; and he burned them without Jerusalem in the fields of Kidron, and carried the ashes of them unto Beth-el.  And he put down the idolatrous priests, whom the kings of Judah had ordained to offer in the high places in the cities of Judah, and in the places round about Jerusalem; them also that offered unto Baal, to the sun, and to the moon, and to the constellations, and to all the host of heaven.

The Septuagint, however, uses the transliteration mazzaroth (μαζουρωθ) again at this point.

Translation
The word is traditionally (following LXX) left untranslated (ABC, ACV, AKJ, ASV, BBE, BIB, ESV, GNV, HNV, JPS, K21, KJG, KJR, KJV, NAB, NKJ, NRS, NWT, RSV, RWB, TMB, TNK, UPD, WEB, YLT, LXE, ZIK), but some modern English Bible translations render it as "zodiac"  (AMP, CJB, EMP, LEE);
others have  "constellations" (CJB, CSB, DBY, NET, ERV, GWN, LEE, LIT, MKJ, NAS, NAU, NIB, NIV, TNV, WEV) or "stars" (CEV, NCB, NIR, NLV, TEV).

But as the Latin Vulgate renders the word as "luciferum", there are alternative English translations as "morning star" (CVB, TRC, furthermore Luther's 1545 German translation as Morgenstern also means "morning star"; (DRA); "Venus" (MSG); "Crown season" (NJB); "sequence of seasons" (NLT); "Lucifer, 'that is, dai sterre (day star)" (Wycliffe's Bible).
WES gives "stars in the southern signs".

Translators' Notes given in individual translations are:
Geneva: Certain stars so called, some think they were the twelve signs.
KJV/KGB: {Mazzaroth: or, the twelve signs}
NAS/NAU: perh. "a constellation"
NET: The word מַּזָּלֹות; (mazzarot) is taken by some to refer to the constellations (see 2 Kings 23:5), and by others as connected to the word for "crown," and so "corona."
NIB/NIV: {32 Or the morning star in its season}

The Targum renders the translation as "guards of the mazalot".

Rashi clarifies mazzarot as "all the gates of the mazalot".

See also
 Biblical names of stars
 Christian views on astrology
 Hebrew astronomy
 Jewish astrology
 Jewish views on astrology

References

External links 
The Gospel Message—Written in the Stars?, Danny Faulkner, Answers Research Journal, February 6, 2013

Hebrew words and phrases in the Hebrew Bible
History of astrology